The 2014 Montreal Alouettes season was the 48th season for the team in the Canadian Football League and their 60th overall. The Alouettes finished the season in 2nd place in the East Division with a 9–9 record. The Alouettes improved upon their 8–10 record from 2013 with their 9th win in their 17th game and qualified for the playoffs for the 19th straight season in that same game. The team defeated the BC Lions in the East Semi-Final, but lost the East Final to the Hamilton Tiger-Cats. The Alouettes set a CFL record as they were the first team to fall six games below .500 with a 1–7 record and finish with a .500 record or better.

Offseason

CFL draft
The 2014 CFL Draft took place on May 13, 2014. The Alouettes had eight selections in the seven-round draft, after acquiring an additional fourth round selection for Dahrran Diedrick.

Preseason 

 Games played with colour uniforms.

Regular season

Standings

Schedule

 Games played with colour uniforms.
 Games played with white uniforms.
 Games played with alternate uniforms.

Post-season

Schedule

 Games played with colour uniforms.
 Games played with white uniforms.

Team

Roster

Coaching staff

References

Montreal Alouettes seasons
2014 Canadian Football League season by team